Eleocharis pusilla is a sedge of the family Cyperaceae that is native to Australia.

It blooms between August and September producing white flowers.

It is found in the Kimberley region of Western Australia where it grows in red loamy-sandy soils around granite.

References

Plants described in 1810
Flora of Western Australia
pusilla
Taxa named by Robert Brown (botanist, born 1773)